Bayezid II (3 December 1447 – 26 May 1512) was the sultan of the Ottoman Empire from 1481 to 1512. During his reign, Bayezid consolidated the Ottoman Empire, thwarted a Safavid rebellion and finally abdicated his throne to his son, Selim I. Bayezid evacuated Sephardi Jews from Spain after the proclamation of the Alhambra Decree and resettled them throughout Ottoman lands, especially in Salonica.

Early life
Bayezid II was the son of Mehmed II (1432–1481) and Gülbahar Hatun, an Albanian concubine.

There are sources that claim that Bayezid was the son of Sittişah Hatun, due to the two women's common middle name, Mükrime. This would make Ayşe Hatun, one of Bayezid's consorts, a first cousin of Bayezid II. However, the marriage of Sittişah Hatun took place two years after Bayezid was born and the whole arrangement was not to Mehmed's liking. 

Born in Demotika, Bayezid II was educated in Amasya and later served there as a bey for 27 years. In 1473, he fought in the Battle of Otlukbeli against the Aq Qoyunlu.

Fight for the throne

Bayezid II's overriding concern was the quarrel with his brother Cem Sultan, who claimed the throne and sought military backing from the Mamluks in Egypt. Karamani Mehmed Pasha, latest grand vizier of Mehmed II, informed him of the death of the Sultan and invited Bayezid to ascend the throne. Having been defeated by his brother's armies, Cem sought protection from the Knights of St. John in Rhodes. Eventually, the Knights handed Cem over to Pope Innocent VIII (1484–1492). The Pope thought of using Cem as a tool to drive the Turks out of Europe, but as the papal crusade failed to come to fruition, Cem died in Naples.

Reign
Bayezid II ascended the Ottoman throne in 1481. Like his father, Bayezid II was a patron of western and eastern culture. Unlike many other sultans, he worked hard to ensure a smooth running of domestic politics, which earned him the epithet of "the Just". Throughout his reign, Bayezid II engaged in numerous campaigns to conquer the Venetian possessions in Morea, accurately defining this region as the key to future Ottoman naval power in the Eastern Mediterranean. In 1497, he went to war with Poland and decisively defeated the 80,000 strong Polish army during the Moldavian campaign. The last of these wars ended in 1501 with Bayezid II in control of the whole Peloponnese. Rebellions in the east, such as that of the Qizilbash, plagued much of Bayezid II's reign and were often backed by the shah of Persia, Ismail I, who was eager to promote Shi'ism to undermine the authority of the Ottoman state. Ottoman authority in Anatolia was indeed seriously threatened during this period and at one point Bayezid II's vizier, Hadım Ali Pasha, was killed in battle against the Şahkulu rebellion. Hadım Ali Pasha's death prompted a power vacuum. As a result, many important statesmen secretly pledged allegiance to Kinsman Karabœcu Pasha (Turkish: "Karaböcü Kuzen Paşa") who made his reputation in conducting espionage operations during the Fall of Constantinople in his youth.

Jewish and Muslim immigration

In July 1492, the new state of Spain expelled its Jewish and Muslim populations as part of the Spanish Inquisition. Bayezid II sent out the Ottoman Navy under the command of admiral Kemal Reis to Spain in 1492 in order to evacuate them safely to Ottoman lands. He sent out proclamations throughout the empire that the refugees were to be welcomed. He granted the refugees the permission to settle in the Ottoman Empire and become Ottoman citizens. He ridiculed the conduct of Ferdinand II of Aragon and Isabella I of Castile in expelling a class of people so useful to their subjects. "You venture to call Ferdinand a wise ruler," he said to his courtiers, "he who has impoverished his own country and enriched mine!" Bayezid addressed a firman to all the governors of his European provinces, ordering them not only to refrain from repelling the Spanish refugees, but to give them a friendly and welcome reception. He threatened with death all those who treated the Jews harshly or refused them admission into the empire. Moses Capsali, who probably helped to arouse the sultan's friendship for the Jews, was most energetic in his assistance to the exiles. He made a tour of the communities and was instrumental in imposing a tax upon the rich, to ransom the Jewish victims of the persecution.

The Muslims and Jews of al-Andalus contributed much to the rising power of the Ottoman Empire by introducing new ideas, methods and craftsmanship. The first printing press in Constantinople (now Istanbul) was established by the Sephardic Jews in 1493. It is reported that under Bayezid's reign, Jews enjoyed a period of cultural flourishing, with the presence of such scholars as the Talmudist and scientist Mordecai Comtino; astronomer and poet Solomon ben Elijah Sharbiṭ ha-Zahab; Shabbethai ben Malkiel Cohen, and the liturgical poet Menahem Tamar.

Succession
During Bayezid II's final years, on 14 September 1509, Constantinople was devastated by an earthquake, and a succession battle developed between his sons Selim and Ahmet. Ahmet unexpectedly captured Karaman, and began marching to Constantinople to exploit his triumph. Fearing for his safety, Selim staged a revolt in Thrace but was defeated by Bayezid and forced to flee back to the Crimean peninsula. Bayezid II developed fears that Ahmet might in turn kill him to gain the throne, so he refused to allow his son to enter Constantinople.Selim returned from Crimea and, with support from the Janissaries, he forced his father to abdicate the throne on 25 April 1512. Bayezid departed for retirement in his native Dimetoka, but he died on 26 May 1512 at Havsa, before reaching his destination and only a month after his abdication. He was buried next to the Bayezid Mosque in Istanbul.

Legacy

Bayezid was praised in a ghazal of Abdürrezzak Bahşı, a scribe who came to Constantinople from Samarkand in the second half of the 15th century that worked at the courts of Mehmed II and Bayezid II, and wrote in Chagatai with the Old Uyghur alphabet:

Bayezid II ordered al-ʿAtufi, the librarian of Topkapı Palace, to prepare a register. The library's diverse holdings reflect a cosmopolitanism that was encyclopaedic in scope.

Family

Consorts
Bayezid had ten known consorts, plus other unknown concubines, mothers of the other sons and daughters:
Şirin Hatun
Hüsnüşah Hatun
Bülbül Hatun
Nigar Hatun
Gülruh Hatun
Gülbahar Hatun
Muhtereme Ferahşad Hatun
Ayşe Hatun. Daughter of Alâüddevle Bozkurt Bey of the Dulkadir dynasty, and niece of Sittişah Hatun, first legal wife of Mehmed II, father of Bayezid. She died in 1512.
Gülfem Hatun
Mühürnaz Hatun

Sons
Bayezid had at least eight sons:
Şehzade Abdullah (Amasya, 1465 - Konya, 11 June 1483) - son of Şirin Hatun. Bayezid's first son, he was governor of Manisa, Trebizond and Konya. He died of unknown causes and was buried in Bursa. He took as consort his cousin Nergiszade Ferahşad Sultan (daughter of Şehzade Mustafa, son of Mehmed II), with whom he had a son who died in infancy (1481-1489) and two daughters, Aynişah Sultan (1482-? , married) and Şahnisa Sultan (1484- ?, who in turn married her cousin Şehzade Mehmed Şah, son of her father's half brother Şehzade Şehinşah).
Şehzade Ahmed (Amasya,  1466 - Bursa, 24 March 1513) - son of Bülbül Hatun. Bayezid's favorite son, he was executed by his half-brother Selim I, who became sultan. He had three known concubines, seven sons and four daughters.
Şehzade Korkut (Amasya, 1469 - Manisa, 10 March 1513) - son of Nigar Hatun. Rival of Selim I for the throne, he was first exiled by them and then executed. He had two children who died as infants and two daughters, Fatma Sultan and Ferahşad Sultan.
 Selim I (Amasya, 10 October 1470 – Çorlu, 22 September 1520) – son with Gülbahar Hatun, who succeeded as Sultan Selim Han I (Yavuz). 
Şehzade Şehinşah (Amasya, 1474 - Karaman, 1511) - son of Hüsnüşah Hatun. He was governor of Manisa and Karaman. He was executed by his father for sedition and buried in Bursa. He had a consort, Mukrime Hatun, mother of his only known son, Şehzade Mehmed Şah (who married his cousin Şahnisa Sultan, daughter of Şehzade Abdullah).
Şehzade Mahmud (Amasya, 1475 - Manisa, 1507) - son of an unknown concubine. He could be the full brother of Gevhermuluk Sultan. He was governor of Kastamonu and Manisa. He had three sons, Şehzade Musa (b.1490), Şehzade Orhan (b.1494) and Şehzade Emir Suleyman, executed by Selim I in 1512, and two daughters, Ayşe Hundi Sultan (1496 - after 1556, married in 1508 to Ferruh Bey; had a daughter Mihrihan Hanımsultan) and Hançerli Zeynep Fatma Sultan (1495 - April 1533, married to Mehmed Bey in 1508; had two children, Sultanzade Kasim Bey and Sultanzade Mahmud Bey. It is believed that she may have istruited the future Hürrem Sultan before she was introduced to Suleiman the Magnificent via Hafsa Sultan or Pargali Ibrahim.
Şehzade Alemşah (Amasya, 1477 - Manisa, 1502) - son of Gülruh Hatun. Governor of Mentese and Manisa. He had a son, Şehzade Osman Şah (1492-1512, killed by Selim), and two daughters, Ayşe Sultan (married to his cousin Mehmed Celebi, son of Fatma Sultan, daughter of Bayezid II) and Fatma Sultan (1493-1522). 
Şehzade Mehmed (Amasya, 1486 - Kefe, December 1504) - son of Ferahşad Hatun. Governor of Kefe. He was married to a princess of the Giray khanate of Crimea (perhaps Ayşe Hatun, who after Mehmed's death married his half-brother Selim) and had a daughter and a son, Fatma Sultan (Kefe; 1500 - Istanbul; 1556) and Şehzade Mehmed (1505, born posthumously - 1513, killed by Selim I).

Daughters
Bayezid II, once ascended to the throne, granted his daughters and granddaughters in the male line the title of "Sultan" and his grandaughters in the female line that of "Hanımsultan", which replaced the simple honorific "Hatun" in use until then. His grandsons in female line obtained instead the title of "Sultanzade". Bayezid's reform of female titles remains in effect today among the surviving members of the Ottoman dynasty.

Bayezid had at least thirteen daughters:
Aynışah Sultan (Amasya; 1463 - Bursa;  1514) - daughter of Şirin Hatun. She married twice, she had two daughters and a son. 
Hatice Sultan (Amasya; 1463 - Bursa; 1500) - daughter of Bülbül Hatun. She married in first time Muderis Kara Mustafa Pasha in 1479 and she had a son, Sultanzade Ahmed Bey and a daughter, Hanzade Hanimsultan. She was widowed in 1483, when her husband was executed on charges of supporting Şehzade Cem's claim to the throne against Bayezid. Hatice remarried the following year to Faik Pasha (d. 1499). She died in 1500 and was buried in her mausoleum, built by her son, in Bursa. Hatice built a mosque, school and fountain in Edirnekapi, Constantinople. Her name means "respectful lady".
Hundi Sultan (Amasya; 1464 - Bursa; 1511) - daughter of Bülbül Hatun. In 1484 he married Hersekzade Ahmed Pasha and had two sons, Sultanzade Musa Bey and Sultanzade Mustafa Bey, and two daughters, Kamerşah Hanımsultan and Hümaşah Hanımsultan.
Ayşe Sultan (Amasya; 1465 - Constantinople; 1515) - daughter of Nigar Hatun. She married once and had two sons and five daughters.
Hümaşah Sultan (Amasya; 1466 - Constantinople; before 1520). Also called Hüma Sultan. She married Bali Pasha, governor of Antalya in 1482 and was widowed in 1495. She remarried Malkoçoğlu Yahya Pasha and had two sons, Sultanzade Ahmed Bey and Sultanzade Mehmed Bey. She was the stepmother of Yahya's son from his first marriage, Bali Bey. Her name meaning "Phoenix of the Şah".
Ilaldi Sultan (Amasya;  1467 - ? ;  1517). She married Hain Ahmed Pasha, governor of Rumelia, Egypt and Second Vizier, and had by him a son of unknown name (who married his cousin Hanzade Hanımsultan, daughter of Selçuk Sultan, daughter of Bayezid II) and a daughter, Şahzade Aynişah Hanimsultan (who married Abdüsselâm Çelebi).
Gevhermüluk Sultan (Amasya; 1467 - Constantinople; 20 January 1550), full sister of Şehzade Mahmud. Married to Dukakinzade Mehmed Pasha, son of Dukaginzade Ahmed Pasha, and she had a son, Sultanzade Mehmed Ahmed Bey (who married his cousin Hanzade Ayşe Mihrihan Hanimsultan, daughter of Ayşe Sultan, daughter of Bayezid II), and a daughter, Neslişah Hanimsultan (who married iskender Pasha). Gevhermuluk built a madrase in Bursa.
Sofu Fatma Sultan, (Amasya; 1468 - Bursa; after 1520) - daughter of Nigar Hatun. She married three times: before 1480 with Isfendiyaroglu Mirza Mehmed Pasha, son of Kyzyl Ahmed Bey, with him she had a son, Sultanzade Isfendiyaroglu Mehmed Pasha (who married his cousin Gevherhan Sultan, daughter of Selim I). The married ended with a divorce. Fatma rimmaried in 1489 with Mustafa Pasha, son of Koca Davud Pasha. Fatma widowed in 1503. Fatma married for third time in 1504 with Güzelce Hasan Bey. With him had two sons, Sultanzade Haci Ahmed Bey and Sultanzade Mehmed Celebi (who married his cousin Ayşe Sultan, daughter of Şehzade Alemşah), and a daughter (who married her cousin Ahmed Bey, son Ali Bey and Fatma Hanımsultan, daughter di Ayşe Sultan). Her name meaning "one who abstain"
Selçuk Sultan (Amasya; 1469 - 1508). She also called Selçukşah Sultan. She married Ferhad Bey in 1584 and had a son, Sultanzade Gaazî Husrev Paşah (1484 - 18 June 1541) and a daughter, Neslişah Hanımsultan (1486 - 1550). She remarried Mehmed Bey in 1587 and had three daughters with him: Hanzade Hanımsultan (who married his cousin, son of Ilaldi Sultan), Hatice Hanımsultan (who married a son of Halil Paşah in 1510) and Aslihan Hanımsultan (who married the Grand Vizier Yunus Paşa in 1502. After Yunus Pasha was executed in 1517, she married Defterdar Mehmed Çelebi in 1518, who was governor of Egypt and then of Damascus. On 21 February 1529 she had a daughter named Selçuk Hanim). She may have married a third time. She died in 1508 and was buried in her mausoleum inside the Bayezid II Mosque in Constantinople
Sultanzade Sultan (Amasya; before 1474 - ?) - daughter of Hüsnüşah Hatun. Her name meaning "descendant of the Sultan". 
Şah Sultan, (Amasya; 1474 - Bursa; after 1506). She also called Şahzade Şah Sultan. She married Nasuh Bey in 1490 and had a daughter with him. She was very charitable and built a mosque in 1506. She was buried in Bursa in the mausoleum of her half-sister Hatice Sultan. Her name meaning "sovereign".
Kamerşah Sultan (Amasya; 1476 - Constantinople; 1520) - daughter of Gülruh Hatun. She is also called Kamer Sultan. She married Koca Mustafa Pasha in 1491, and had a daughter, Hundi Hanımsultan, who married Mesih Bey. She widowed in 1512 and remarried Nişancı Kara Davud Pasha. Her name means "moon of Şah" or "trust of Şah". 
Şahzade Sultan (Amasya, ? - ?, 1520). She married Yahya Pasha in 1501 and had three sons, Sultanzade Yahyapaşazade Gaazi Küçük Bali Pasha (? - 1543, married his cousin Hanzade Hanimsultan, daughter of Aynişah Sultan, daughter of Bayezid II and Şirin Hatun), Sultanzade Gaazi Koca Mehmed Pasha (? - March 1548) and Sultanzade Gaazi Ahmed Bey (? - after 1543). Her name means "descendant of Şah".

In popular culture 
 Sultan Bayezid II's statesmanship, tolerance, and intellectual abilities are depicted in the historical novel The Sultan's Helmsman, which takes place in the middle years of his reign.
 Sultan Bayezid II and his struggle with his son Selim is a prominent subplot in the video game Assassin's Creed: Revelations. In the game, due to Bayezid's absence from Constantinople, the Byzantines had the opportunity to sneak back into the city, hoping to revive their fallen empire. Near the end of the game, Bayezid surrendered the throne to his son Selim. However, Bayezid does not make an actual appearance.
 Bayezid II, prior to becoming Sultan, is depicted by Akin Gazi in the Starz series Da Vinci's Demons. He seeks an audience with Pope Sixtus IV (having been manipulated into believing that peace between Rome and Constantinople is a possibility), only to be ridiculed and humiliated by Sixtus, actions which later serve as a pretext for the Ottoman invasion of Otranto. Sixtus assumes that Bayezid has been overlooked in favor of his brother Cem.

See also
Ottoman–Mamluk War (1485–1491)
Polish–Ottoman War (1485–1503)

References
Notes

Bibliography

External links 
 

1447 births
1512 deaths
15th-century caliphs
15th-century Ottoman sultans
16th-century Ottoman sultans
Burials in Turkey
Monarchs who abdicated
People from Didymoteicho
Dethroned monarchs